The St. John the Baptist Cathedral Also Engativá Cathedral Is a cathedral of the Catholic Church, dedicated to San Juan Bautista, located in Engativá a sector of the capital district of Bogota, in the South American country of Colombia. Since 6 August 2003 it is the seat of the Bishop of Engativá by decree of Pope John Paul II. It also takes the name "de la Estrada" by the sector of its location.

The Church was originally intended only as a parish church, but after the Diocese of Engativá was separated from the Archdiocese of Bogotá, because of the size and location of the cathedral building, John Paul II, declared it as the Cathedral of the Diocese.

The Cathedral is a rectangular building of approx. 10 m. Of height 12 of width and 60 of depth, with an approximated capacity of 800 people seated and another 400 standing. It has a single nave of walls in "zig zag", presents white marble floors and walls of the same color. The ceiling of 10 meters of height is white and presents / displays several skylights, with metallic structures that support the sky of plaster.

See also
List of cathedrals in Colombia
Roman Catholicism in Colombia
St. John the Baptist

References

Roman Catholic cathedrals in Colombia
Roman Catholic churches in Bogotá